William Henry Samuel Purcell (1912-1994) was Archdeacon of Dorking from 1968 until 1982.

Biography
Purcell was born in or near to Norwich on 22 January 1912.
Purcell was educated at Norwich School and Fitzwilliam College, Cambridge and ordained in 1938. After a curacy in  Headingley, Yorkshire he was raised to the position of a Minor Canon of Ripon Cathedral in that county. He held incumbencies (as priest leading a church) in Leeds, Yorkshire and Epsom, Surrey before his appointment as Archdeacon which he retired at the age of 70.  He lived a further 12 years until 4 June 1994.

Notes

1912 births
People educated at Norwich School
Alumni of Fitzwilliam College, Cambridge
Archdeacons of Dorking
1994 deaths